Manaquiri is a municipality located in the Brazilian state of Amazonas. Its population was 33,049 (2020) and its area is 3,976 km².

References

Municipalities in Amazonas (Brazilian state)
Populated places on the Amazon